Ipatovo is the name of several inhabited localities in Russia.

Urban localities
Ipatovo, Stavropol Krai, a town in Ipatovsky District of Stavropol Krai

Rural localities
Ipatovo, Komi Republic, a village in Sludka Selo Administrative Territory of Syktyvdinsky District of the Komi Republic
Ipatovo, Nizhny Novgorod Oblast, a village in Bolshesodomovsky Selsoviet of Tonkinsky District of Nizhny Novgorod Oblast
Ipatovo, Tomsk Oblast, a village in Tomsky District of Tomsk Oblast